Halderman is a surname. Notable people with the surname include:

J. Alex Halderman (born 1981), American computer scientist
Joe Halderman (born 1957), American television news writer, director, and producer
Linda Halderman (born 1968), American politician

See also
Haldeman